S. Ali Raza (9 January 1925 – 1 November 2007) was an Indian film screenwriter and director associated with writing the script for hit films such as Aan, Andaz, Mother India, Reshma Aur Shera, Raja Jani and Dus Numbri.

In 1968, he won the Filmfare award as the best dialogue writer for Saraswatichandra. In 1975 he directed a film titled Pran Jaye Par Vachan Na Jaye.

He was married to actress Nimmi who appeared in Uran Khatola, Barsaat, Deedar, Amar, Aan, Char Paise, Rajdhani, Shamma, Pooja Ke Phool, Mere Mehboob for which he had written the dialogues. He and Nimmi lived in Mumbai until his death at the age of 82 on 1 November 2007.

External links 
 
 Obituary

1925 births
2007 deaths
Indian Muslims
20th-century Indian film directors
Indian male screenwriters
Writers from Lucknow
Screenwriters from Uttar Pradesh
20th-century Indian dramatists and playwrights
Hindi screenwriters
Urdu-language writers
20th-century Indian male writers
20th-century Indian screenwriters